Anthochori is a village in the municipal unit of Tsotyli, Kozani regional unit, Greece. It is situated at an altitude of 670 meters. The postal code is 50100, and the telephone code is +30 24680. The population was 136 at the 2011 census.

References

Populated places in Kozani (regional unit)